Qarxis is a town in the Nugal province of the autonomous Puntland region in northeastern Somalia.

References

Populated places in Nugal, Somalia

Qarxis City Is Northeastern Nugaal State puntland Somalia Qarxis is over Papulate City' Qarxis city most papulate is Yonis Idiris sab clan Iise Mohamud.  City qarxis has most livestock.like camel, gout,sheep and alots
qarxis city was found 1970s,Qarxis is located strategic area east coast close to Eyl city like 90 miles west coast is dangorayo city colse to 40 miles.